Wushao Mountain, Wushao Ling Mountain or Wushaoling is a landform in Gansu Province, China, with significant desert elements on its northern slope.

The mountain has been a barrier to transportation since ancient times, when the Northern Silk Road found a passage across its terrain. The western slope of Wushao Ling combined with adjoining slopes of Lanshan Mountain comprises over 30 percent of the desert area of China. Given the current trend in China's land use policies, desertification of the Wushao Ling slopes and other Chinese deserts is projected to expand.

The mountain range is crossed by:

 China National Highway 312, through the Wushaoling Pass (3030 m)
 G30 Lianyungang–Khorgas Expressway, through a tunnel
 Lanzhou–Xinjiang high-speed railway, through the Wushaoling Tunnel (21.05 km)

Climate 

Mount Wushao has a subarctic climate (Köppen climate classification Dwc).

References

Mountains of Gansu
Landforms of Gansu